This is a list of awards and nominations received by Canadian actor Jacob Tremblay. He is best known for co-starring as Jack Newsome in the 2015 film Room, for which he won the Critics' Choice Movie Award for Best Young Performer and the Canadian Screen Award for Best Actor, and was nominated for the Screen Actors Guild Award for Outstanding Performance by a Male Actor in a Supporting Role.

Awards and nominations

Austin Film Critics Association

Awards Circuit Community Awards

Canadian Screen Awards

Central Ohio Film Critics Association

Chicago Film Critics Association

Critics' Choice Movie Awards

Detroit Film Critics Society

Empire Awards

Irish Film & Television Academy Awards

Las Vegas Film Critics Society

National Board of Review

San Diego Film Critics Society

Saturn Award

Screen Actors Guild Awards

Seattle Film Critics Society

Teen Choice Awards

Vancouver Film Critics Circle

Washington D.C. Area Film Critics Association

Young Artist Award

References

External links
 

Lists of awards received by Canadian actor